Don't Set Your Dogs on Me is a studio album by Polish rock band Coma, released on 8 February 2013. The album is distributed in Poland through Mystic Production, and worldwide through German label earMUSIC/Edel. The album was produced by Tomasz Zalewski.

Background and recording
Don't Set Your Dogs on Me contains songs from Coma's 2011 untitled record, commonly known as Czerwony album (The Red Album). However, the band's frontman Piotr Rogucki wrote new lyrics for all the tracks. An additional track, titled "Song 4 Boys", was written for the soundtrack of Polish TV series Misja Afghanistan, in which Rogucki (who is also an actor) played one of the lead characters. Don't Set Your Dogs on Me is Coma's second English-language album, the first one being Excess (2010).

Promotion
The album was promoted by several music videos. An official music video for "With You" was released onto YouTube on 17 December 2012. On 17 January 2013, footage from a rehearsal of "Rainy Song" was released. An official music video for "Song 4 Boys" was released on 20 March 2013.

Track listing

Personnel
Coma
Piotr Rogucki – vocals
Dominik Witczak – guitar
Marcin Kobza – guitar
Rafał Matuszak – bass guitar
Adam Marszałkowski – drums

Charts

Release history

References

Coma (band) albums
2013 albums
Mystic Production albums